SAO Northern Bosnia ( / SAO Sjeverna Bosna) was a self-proclaimed ethnic Serb Autonomous Region ( / SAO) in the Socialist Republic of Bosnia and Herzegovina (SRBiH) in the prelude to the Bosnian War. It was established on 4 November 1991, being the last SAO to be proclaimed. It existed between November 1991 and 9 January 1992, when it became part of Republic of the Serb people of Bosnia and Herzegovina (later Republika Srpska). Blagoje Simić was the president of the Assembly of SAO Northern Bosnia from 4 November to 30 November 1991. Nikola Perišić was the President of the Executive Council of SAO Northern Bosnia from 4 November 1991 to 9 January 1992.

Government

President of the Assembly 

 Blagoje Simić (4 November 1991 – 30 November 1991)

President of the Executive Council 

 Nikola Perišić (4 November 1991 – 9 January 1992)

See also 

 Serb Autonomous Regions
 SAO Bosanska Krajina
 SAO Romanija
 SAO North-East Bosnia
 SAO Herzegovina

References

External links 

 Map

Regions of Bosnia and Herzegovina